Q45 may refer to:
 Q45 (host), host of the American television series Rap City
 Q45 (New York City bus)
 Al-Jathiya, the 45th surah of the Quran
 Infiniti Q45, an automobile
 Samsung Q45, a laptop
 Intel Q45, an Intel chipsets